Kevin Edward Blackwell (born October 24, 1954) is a  Republican member of the Mississippi State Senate. Since January 2016, he has represented District 19, including parts of DeSoto and Marshall counties in northern Mississippi.

He resides in Southaven in DeSoto County and formerly lived in Olive Branch, also in DeSoto County, and Little Rock, Arkansas.

References

1954 births
Living people
Republican Party Mississippi state senators
People from Southaven, Mississippi
Politicians from Little Rock, Arkansas
21st-century American politicians